Declan McDonnell (born 1948) is an independent politician in Ireland, having previously been a member of the Progressive Democrats. He was elected in June 2009 as Mayor of Galway, He had held the office from 1999 to 2000.

Biography
He was born in 1948 in Galway to Paddy McDonnell of Moore Street, Loughrea; and Kay Kelly of Woodford. He was the eldest of four children. His parents had moved to Galway in 1846.  He is by profession an accountant and a management consultant of over forty years experience. He married Mary Long of Mervue in 1972 and their children are Jeannette, Noel, Marie, Brian.

During his first term as Mayor he travelled across the world representing Galway on trade missions. One of his first functions as Mayor was attending the launch of the journal of the Galway Archaeological and Historical Society; he was instrumental in the preservation of the Ballybane Mor ringfort.

References

External links
 Mayors of Galway

Politicians from County Galway
Mayors of Galway
1948 births
Living people
Progressive Democrats politicians
Independent politicians in Ireland
Local councillors in Galway (city)